Zain Duraie is a Jordanian director, writer and actress. She is best known for her work on the short film Give Up the Ghost.

Life and career
Duraie was born and raised in Amman, Jordan.
Duraie graduated from the Toronto Film School. She started her career as a trainee at Philistine Films with filmmaker Annemarie Jacir and producer Ossama Bawardi. Her directorial debut short film Horizon, won the Best of the Festival Selects at the Palm Springs International Festival of Short Films, Audience Choice Award at the Franco Arab Film Festival and Best first young filmmaker at the Algeria’s International women film festival. In 2019, her second short film Give up the Ghost premiered in competition at the Venice International Film Festival and won the Best Arab Short Film award at the El Gouna Film Festival.

Filmography

As Actress
 2016 - In Overtime (short film)
 2018 - The Box (short film)

References

External links

Living people
Jordanian film directors
Jordanian writers
People from Amman
Year of birth missing (living people)
Jordanian women film directors